, born in Wakayanagi, Miyagi, Japan, was a Japanese musician best known for his band Himekami.

Hoshi won the 1971 Victor Electronic Music Contest, and founded Himekami Sensation in 1980. His debut album was Oku no Hosomichi, released in 1981. In 1984, the group name was changed to Himekami. Hoshi was known for being very friendly with his fans, and thanking them for purchasing his works.  The music was basically electronic, new-age with sounds of nature and elements of traditional Japanese music.

Hoshi died of a heart attack on October 1, 2004, at 1:21am. His funeral service was held on October 24, 2004, at a Shinto shrine in Hiraizumi, Iwate Prefecture.

Discography
Oku No Hosomichi (1981)
Tohno (1982)
Himekami (1982)
Tohno Monogatari (1982) (soundtrack)
Himekami Densetsu (1983)
Mahoroba (1984) (with Yas-Kaz)
Kaido (1985) (with Yas-Kaz) (soundtrack)
Hokuten Genso (1986)
Himekami Special (1986)
Setsufu (1987)
Toki Wo Mitsumete (1988) (soundtrack)
Himekami Fudoki (1989)
Moonwater (1989)
Ihatovo Hidakami (1990)
Snow Goddess (1991)
Zipangu Himekami (1992)
Homura (1993)
Tsugaru (1994)
Mayoiga (1995)
Himekami Johdo Mandara (1995)
Kaze No Jomon (1996)
Kaze No Jomon II: Toki No Sora (1997)
Kaze No Jomon III: Jomon Kairyuu (1998)
Shinra Bansho (1998)
Seed (1999)
Sennen Kairo (2000)
Aoi-Hana (2003)

References

External links
 News report of Hoshi's death and funeral (video)
 Interview

1946 births
2004 deaths
New-age synthesizer players
Musicians from Miyagi Prefecture
20th-century Japanese musicians